The 1888 Democratic National Convention was a nominating convention held June 5 to 7, 1888, in the St. Louis Exposition and Music Hall in St. Louis, Missouri. It nominated President Grover Cleveland for reelection and former Senator Allen G. Thurman of Ohio for vice president.

St. Louis won the convention after a presentation in February 1888.

Proceedings 
Stephen M. White served as temporary chairman and Patrick A. Collins served as the convention's permanent president.

Platform 
The Democratic platform largely confined itself to a defense of the Cleveland administration, supporting reduction in the tariff and taxes generally as well as statehood for the western territories.

Presidential nomination

Presidential candidates 

President Cleveland was renominated by acclamation. An event few could directly remember, as the last time a Democrat was renominated was 48 years earlier, in 1840. Presidents Franklin Pierce and Andrew Johnson lost the nomination in 1852 and 1868 respectively, and Presidents James K. Polk and James Buchanan refused to run for a second term.

Vice Presidential nomination

Vice Presidential candidates 

After Cleveland was re-nominated, Democrats had to choose a replacement for Thomas A. Hendricks, who had died in office on November 25, 1885. Hendricks had run unsuccessfully as the Democratic nominee for vice-president in 1876, but had won the office when he ran again with Cleveland in 1884.

Three names were placed in nomination: Allen G. Thurman, Isaac P. Gray, and John C. Black. Former Senator Thurman of Ohio was nominated for vice-president over Indiana Governor Gray, his nearest rival, and John C. Black, who trailed behind. Gray lost the nomination to Thurman primarily because his enemies brought up his actions while a Republican.

See also 
 History of the United States Democratic Party
 Grover Cleveland 1888 presidential campaign
 1888 United States presidential election
 U.S. presidential nomination convention
 List of Democratic National Conventions
 1888 Republican National Convention

References

Further reading 
 Nevins, Allan. Grover Cleveland: A Study in Courage (1932) online.

Primary sources 
 Chester, Edward W A guide to political platforms (1977) pp 115–120 online

External links 
 Democratic Party Platform of 1888 at The American Presidency Project
 Official Proceedings of the National Democratic Convention, Held in St. Louis, Mo., June 5th, 6th and 7th, 1888

1888 United States presidential election
1888 in Missouri
19th century in St. Louis
Conventions in St. Louis
Political conventions in Missouri
Missouri Democratic Party
Democratic National Conventions
1888 conferences
June 1888 events